The 2015 Indy Eleven season will be the club's second season of existence. The club will play in North American Soccer League, the second tier of the American soccer pyramid.

Roster

Staff
  Jeff Belskus – President
  Tom Dunmore – Vice President of Marketing & Operations
  Tim Regan – Interim Head Coach & Director of Soccer Operations
  Kleberson – Assistant Coach
  Gary Yohe – Goalkeeper Coach

Transfers

Winter
Note: Flags indicate national team as has been defined under FIFA eligibility rules. Players may hold more than one non-FIFA nationality.

In:

Out:

Summer
Note: Flags indicate national team as has been defined under FIFA eligibility rules. Players may hold more than one non-FIFA nationality.

In:

Out:

Friendlies

Competitions

NASL Spring season

Standings

Results summary

Results by round

Matches

NASL Fall season

Standings

Results summary

Results by round

Matches

U.S. Open Cup 

The Eleven will compete in the 2015 edition of the Open Cup.

Squad statistics

Appearances and goals

|-
|colspan="14"|Players who left Indy Eleven during the season:

|}

Goal scorers

Disciplinary record

References

External links
 

Indy Eleven seasons
American soccer clubs 2015 season
2015 in sports in Indiana
2015 North American Soccer League season